Wolio is an Austronesian language spoken in and around Baubau on Buton Island, Southeast Sulawesi, Indonesia. It belongs to the Wotu–Wolio branch of the  Celebic subgroup. Also known as Buton, it is a trade language and the former court language of the Sultan at Baubau. Today it is an official regional language; street signs are written in the Buri Wolio alphabet, based on the Arabic script.

Phonology 
The consonant system is characterized by the presence of prenasalized stops, which are treated as a single sound in Wolio.

 are found in loans, mostly from Arabic.

Stress is on the penultimate syllable, and only open syllables are allowed.

Grammar 
Wolio personal pronouns have one independent form, and three bound forms.

Number is not distinguished in third person. Optionally, plural number can be expressed by means of the plural-marker :  'they'.

See also
Cia-Cia language
List of loan words in Indonesian

References

Bibliography

Further reading
 
 

Wotu–Wolio languages
Languages of Sulawesi